Vasily Maksimovich Vlasov (born 27 June 1995, in Moscow) is a Russian politician. He is a deputy of the State Duma of the Federal Assembly of the Russian Federation of the VII convocation from 5 October 2016, year. Since April 2019, he is the first deputy chairman of the State Duma committee on natural resources, property and land relations.

Biography

Education
Vasily Vlasov was born on 27 June 1995, in Moscow, and grew up in a single parent household. He studied at high school number 1350 in Moscow, including advanced studies in mathematics and physics. Vlasov later studied in the Institute of World Civilizations (Russian: Институт Мировых Цивилизаций), and at the Institute of Social and Humanities Education at Moscow State Pedagogical University. The Institute of World Civilizations is an accredited college that was established by Vladimir Zhirinovsky and the populist Liberal Democratic Party of Russia (LDPR).

Early career
At 16, he began working in the youth organization of the Liberal Democratic Party of Russia. Later, he became the director of the youth organization of the Liberal Democratic Party in Moscow. He was appointed head of the national youth organization of the Liberal Democratic Party, and also held a lead position in the office of Vladimir Zhirinovsky, leader of the Liberal Democratic Party. However, none of these were paid positions, as his financial disclosure revealed no income in 2015.

Deputy of the State Duma Russian Federation 
In 2016, Vlasov was elected as a deputy in the State Duma, the lower house of the Federal Assembly of Russia, while still a university student. After the elections to the State Duma, he resigned as head of the youth organization of the Liberal Democratic Party. He is a representative for the Leningradsky constituency in Moscow. His first day in office was 5 October 2016, at the age of 21 years and 3 months. He is a member of the Committee on Physical Culture, Sports, Tourism and Youth Affairs.

In November 2016, Vlasov and fellow LDPR deputy Boris Chernyshov prepared a bill to lower the voting age in Russia from 18 to 16. This has been a policy of the LDPR since 2014, reflecting the popularity of the party among young people. However, the bill was swiftly rejected by the Russian government. Vlasov has also suggested lowering student train fares to encourage domestic tourism, particularly outside the vacation season, and to facilitate youth attendance at cultural and sporting events.

Following the rejection of their proposal to lower the voting age, Vlasov and Chernyshov advanced a similar proposal within the LDPR in January 2017. Vlasov suggested that involving people in political parties between the ages of 16 and 18 would help address declining turnout in elections, and lead to wider involvement in the political process.

On 24 March 2022, the United States Treasury sanctioned him in response to the 2022 Russian invasion of Ukraine.

References

External links
 Депутат. Клуб
 Кандидат Власов

1995 births
Living people
Liberal Democratic Party of Russia politicians
Seventh convocation members of the State Duma (Russian Federation)
Moscow State Pedagogical University alumni
Politicians from Moscow
21st-century Russian politicians
Eighth convocation members of the State Duma (Russian Federation)
Russian individuals subject to the U.S. Department of the Treasury sanctions
Sanctioned due to Russo-Ukrainian War